The 2011–12 West of Scotland Super League Premier Division was the tenth Super League Premier Division competition since the formation of the Scottish Junior Football Association, West Region in 2002. The season began on 13 August 2011. The winners of this competition gain direct entry to round one of the 2012–13 Scottish Cup. The two last placed sides were  relegated to the Super League First Division. The third-bottom placed side entered the West Region league play-off, a two-legged tie against the third placed side in the Super League First Division, to decide the final promotion/relegation spot.

Irvine Meadow won the championship on 19 May 2012, their third title in four seasons.

Kilbirnie Ladeside and Largs Thistle were relegated. Pollok defeated Renfrew in the West Region league play-off to retain their place in the division.

Member clubs for the 2011–12 season
Irvine Meadow are the reigning champions. Ashfield and Clydebank were promoted from the Super League First Division, replacing Lanark United and Rutherglen Glencairn. Petershill retained their place in the league after defeating Glenafton Athletic in the West Region League play-off.

Managerial changes

Table

Results

West Region League play-off

Pollok win 5 – 1 on aggregate and retain their place in the West of Scotland Super League Premier Division for the 2012–13 season.

References

6
SJFA West Region Premiership seasons